Ancylis platanana is a species of moth of the family Tortricidae. It is found in the eastern United States, including Illinois, Maryland, North Carolina, Oklahoma, Pennsylvania and Texas.

The wingspan is 11–15 mm. It is a variable species. There are at least four generations per year.

The larvae feed on Platanus species, including Platanus occidentalis. They live on the underside of the leaves, folding them slightly and spinning a web shelter under which they feed and pupate.

References

Moths described in 1860
Enarmoniini
Moths of North America